Frances Slocum State Forest is 516 acres of natural land managed by the Indiana Department of Natural Resources. Some activities at Frances Slocum State Forest include hiking, fishing, hunting and horseback riding trails.

Location 
Located near Kokomo, Peru and Wabash, in Miami County, Indiana. Some nearby attractions include the Frances Slocum State Park, Mississinewa Reservoir, Asherwood Nature Preserve and Salmonie River State Forest.

Roughly triangular, the park runs beside the Mississinewa River. Frances Slocum has 516 acres.

Indiana State Forests 
Frances Slocum State Forest is one of 15 state forests managed by Indiana DNR. Most state forests in Indiana were founded because the land was too rugged to farm on. In some cases they are used to conserve Indiana's woodlands.

The first forest to be established was 1903 which was Clark State Forest. With the hope that tree regrowth could be seen in the park. Now today with the addition of 14 more State Forests there is over 58.4 million trees.

Petition to State Forest 
In 2019 a group called Friends of Salamonie Forest where they asked for the Indiana Natural Resources Commission to designate the Frances Slocum State Forest as a State Park along with Salamonie Forest. The petition, which received over 850 signatures, argued that turning these areas into State Parks would establish old forests, increase wildlife diversity and allow more visitors to the northeast Indiana. Another big aspect of the petition was that it would stop the logging plans being established. In addition the group is calling for better trails. To stop erosion that has started to occur through the forests. 

At that time Huntington Mayor Brooks Fetter made the claim, "We want an extension to give us here in northeast Indiana an opportunity to see what can be done to save these trees and save these parks for ourselves and for our posterity."

People who opposed the petition said that it would limit recreational activities taking place at the park. They also said that the logging that is being proposed would not hurt the natural environment. 

The commission unanimously voted to deny all parts of the petition. Rendering Frances Slocum State Forest a place where logging, hunting and fishing can take place.

Activities 
Some activities that people can do while at Frances Slocum State Forest includes, equestrian trails, hiking trails, hunting, fishing, foraging, and there is access to the Mississinewa river. There is no camping available at Frances Slocum State Forest, this park is a day use only park. 

The Frances Slocum Boy Scout Trail is 2.5 miles long, it has 160 foot elevation gain and is a loop trail. It is ranked as at moderate difficulty. Dogs are required to be on leash but are allowed to be on the trail. There are complaints that the trail is underkept and needs to be more maintained then it currently is.

Flora and fauna 
While Frances Slocum state forest does not have any rare tree types, some common trees found in Indiana that would be found at this state forest include the Conifer, Deciduous Hardwood, and Evergreen.

Some common wildlife that could also be spotted while at Frances Slocum include, coyotes, beavers, cottontail rabbits, fox squirrels, gray squirrels, raccoons, gray foxes, and red foxes. Some amphibians and reptiles that could be spotted include the snapping turtle, and eastern hog-nosed snake. 

Some native Indiana birds include many song birds such as the state bird a cardinal, wild turkey, and bobwhite quail. In rare sightings the belted kingfisher can be spotted, it is the only king fisher found in the state.

Places to stay nearby 
Since Frances Slocum state forest is close to three large towns in Indiana there are plenty of hotels to stay at. Some of the closest are in Wabash. The Salamonie River State Forest is very close to Frances Slocum state Forest. The park has primitive campground with 21 family campsites and 15 horseman's campsites. They are available on a first-come, first-served basis.

Weather 
In Miami County the average rain fall is 41 inches per year which is slightly above the average rainfall in the United States. The county receives 28 inches of snow on average, it has 179 sunny days per year. In the summer months average high temperature in July is 84 degrees while in the winter the average low in January is 17 degrees. The most fair weather conditions fall in June, September, and August.

History 
The park was established in the mid 1930s. The state forest is named after Frances Slocum. She was a Native American captive from the Delaware Tribe. She lived from 1773 to 1847. She lived with the Miami Indians in the land the covers Ohio and Indiana. Given the opportunity to return to her blood family she chose to live with her adopted Native American Family. She was married to a man named Shepoconah who would become of the Chief of the Miami People but would give up his duties as Chief when he became deaf. He started a village called Deaf Man's Village in Peru, Indiana.

Murder 
In 2018, Drake Smith, 22, was beaten to death inside Frances Slocum State Forest. His murderer was convicted in 2022 and sentenced to 55 years. The man, Ethan Cain, 24, killed Smith in May 2018, over drugs and money. Smith's body was found the same day by mushroom hunters in the park. A few days later Cain and his accomplices Joshua Kean, and Brittany Morris in Southern California. Joshua Kean and Brittany Morris are both still being tried as of date.

References 

Indiana state forests